Triethylammonium acetate is a volatile salt, which is often used as an ion-pairing reagent in high-performance liquid chromatography separations of oligonucleotides.  Since unadjusted triethylammonium acetate salt solutions contain neither conjugate acid nor conjugate base, they are not buffers.

References 

Ammonium compounds
Acetates